Mesplet Lake is a freshwater body in the north-eastern part of Senneterre in Vallée-de-l'Or Regional County Municipality (RCM), in the administrative region of Abitibi-Témiscamingue, in the province of Quebec, in Canada.

Mesplet Lake is located in the township of Mesplet and Masères. Forestry is the main economic activity of the sector. Recreational tourism activities come second. Mesplet Lake is part of the Saint-Cyr Lake Biodiversity Reserve.

The Mesplet Lake hydrographic slope is accessible via a forest road (North-South direction) that passes on the east side of the Saint-Cyr River Valley; in addition, another forest road (East-West direction) serves the north of the Saint-Cyr Lake Biodiversity Reserve.

The surface of Mesplet Lake is usually frozen from early November to mid-May, however, safe ice circulation is generally from mid-November to mid-April.

Geography

Toponymy
The "Mesplet Lake" hydronym is linked to that of the township of Mesplet.

The toponym "lac Mesplet" was officialized on December 5, 1968 by the Commission de toponymie du Québec, when it was created.

Notes and references

See also 

Lakes of Abitibi-Témiscamingue
Nottaway River drainage basin